Bob Hawks may refer to:

 Bob Hawks (Montana politician) (born 1941), member of the Montana Senate
 Bob Hawks (Tennessee politician) (born 1926), member of the Tennessee House of Representatives